Dorothy Johnson may refer to:
Dorothy Johnson (actress) (born 1936), American model and actress
Dorothy M. Johnson (1905–1984), American author of Western fiction
Dorothy Vena Johnson (1898–1970), American poet and educator
Dorothy E. Johnson (1919–1999), American nursing theorist

See also
Dorothy Johnston (born 1948), Australian author of crime and literary fiction
Dorothy Johnstone (1892–1980), Scottish artist